Lakeside Herbal Solutions is a cannabis dispensary located on Mullen Avenue in Clearlake, California.

Description
Lakeside Herbal Solutions, owned by Chris Jennings, is one of 3 cannabis dispensaries located in Clearlake, California. Lakeside Herbal Solutions sources it's cannabis from Jennings' own South Lake Farms, which Jennings spent tens of thousands of dollars and hired a handful of consultants on in order to meet California's environmental impact requirements for cannabis applications. In August 2018 it was reported that, due to California's then new packaging and testing regulations which took effect on July 1 of that year, the price of an eighth of an ounce of flower rose form $35 to $62.

References

Clearlake, California
Companies based in Lake County, California
Cannabis in California
Cannabis dispensaries in the United States